Tony Briscoe (22 April 1939 – 1 December 2018) was a South African swimmer. He competed in two events at the 1956 Summer Olympics.

References

External links
 

1939 births
2018 deaths
South African male swimmers
Olympic swimmers of South Africa
Swimmers at the 1956 Summer Olympics
Place of birth missing